The Ninth Federal Electoral District of Chiapas (IX Distrito Electoral Federal de Chiapas) is one of the 300 Electoral Districts into which Mexico is divided for the purpose of elections to the federal Chamber of Deputies and one of 12 such districts in the state of Chiapas.

It elects one deputy to the lower house of Congress for each three-year legislative period, by means of the first past the post system.

District territory
The Ninth  District of Chiapas is the state's smallest federal electoral district in area. It covers the north-eastern section of the municipality of Tuxtla Gutiérrez, approximating to the eastern half of that city (the state capital), together with a portion of its rural hinterland.

The district's head town (cabecera distrital), where results from individual polling stations are gathered together and collated, is the city of Tuxtla Gutiérrez.

Previous districting schemes

1996–2005 district
Between 1996 and 2005, the Ninth  District covered the whole of the municipality of Tuxtla Gutiérrez, with the city serving as the head town.

The Ninth District of Chiapas was created in 1977. Prior to that year, Chiapas only had six federal electoral districts. The Ninth District elected its first deputy, to the 51st Congress, in 1979.

Deputies returned to Congress from this district

LI Legislature
1979–1982: César Augusto Santiago (PRI)
LII Legislature
1982–1985: Eloy Morales Espinoza (PRI)
LIII Legislature
1985–1988:
LIV Legislature
1988–1991: Arely Madrid Tovilla (PRI)
LV Legislature
1991–1994:
LVI Legislature
1994–1997: Lázaro Hernández Vázquez (PRI)
LVII Legislature
1997–2000: Carlos Morales Vázquez (PRD)
LVIII Legislature
2000–2003: Enoch Aráujo Sánchez (PAN)
LIX Legislature
2003–2006: Francisco Rojas Toledo (PAN)
LX Legislature
2006–2009: Carlos Morales Vázquez (PRD)

References and notes 

Federal electoral districts of Mexico
Government of Chiapas